Węgrzynów may refer to the following places in Poland:
Węgrzynów, Milicz County in Lower Silesian Voivodeship (south-west Poland)
Węgrzynów, Trzebnica County in Lower Silesian Voivodeship (south-west Poland)
Węgrzynów, Łódź Voivodeship (central Poland)
Węgrzynów, Świętokrzyskie Voivodeship (south-central Poland)
Nowy Węgrzynów in Jędrzejów County, Świętokrzyskie Voivodeship
Stary Węgrzynów in Jędrzejów County, Świętokrzyskie Voivodeship